Lackeya is a monotypic genus of flowering plants belonging to the family Fabaceae. It only contains one known species, 'Lackeya multiflora' (Torr. & A.Gray) Fortunato, L.P.Queiroz & G.P.Lewis  It has the common name of Boykin's Clusterpea (Dioclea multiflora).
 

It is a climbing herbaceous plant that grows in warm temperate to subtropical riverine woodland, woodland margins and grassland.

Its native range is central and south-eastern USA. It is found in the states of Alabama, Arkansas, Florida, Georgia, Illinois, Kentucky, Oklahoma, Tennessee and Texas.

The genus name of Lackeya is in honour of James A. Lackey (b. 1943), American botanist at Iowa State University and the Smithsonian Institution and also specialist in Fabaceae and Phaseoleae families of plants. The Latin specific epithet of multiflora means multiple or many flowers.
Both genus and species were first described and published in Kew Bull. Vol.51 on pages 365-366 in 1996.

References

Phaseoleae
Fabaceae genera
Plants described in 1996
Flora of the Southeastern United States